Kulasekara is a Sinhalese surname that may refer to the following notable people:
Kavindu Kulasekara (born 1995), Sri Lankan cricketer
Kosala Kulasekara (born 1985), Sri Lankan cricketer
Kulasekara Pandyan, King of the Pandyan dynasty
Maravarman Kulasekara Pandyan I, King of the Pandyan dynasty
Nuwan Kulasekara (born 1982), Sri Lankan cricketer

Sinhalese surnames